Joseph Aloysius "Goldie" Rapp (February 6, 1892 - July 1, 1966) was an American professional baseball third baseman. He played in Major League Baseball (MLB) for the New York Giants and Philadelphia Phillies from 1921–1923.

In 276 games over three seasons, Rapp posted a .253 batting average (269-for-1064) with 134 runs, 2 home runs, 73 RBI and 75 bases on balls. He recorded a .945 fielding percentage in the majors.

External links

 

1892 births
1966 deaths
Major League Baseball third basemen
Philadelphia Phillies players
Baseball players from Ohio
New York Giants (NL) players